Küçükhusun is a village in the Ayvacık District of Çanakkale Province in Turkey. Its population is 149 (2021).

References

Villages in Ayvacık District, Çanakkale